The Chatham Group is a Triassic-age geologic group in the eastern United States. It is one of the most fossiliferous sections of the Newark Supergroup, preserving much of the Late Triassic up until the Triassic-Jurassic mass extinction. The group was originally named to refer to Triassic rocks (the Pekin, Cumnock, and Sanford formations) specifically within the Deep River Basin of North Carolina. Later studies have utilized it to encompass Late Triassic strata in most other sedimentary basins in the Newark Supergroup.

References

External links 
 

Triassic System of North America